The 2020 season for the CCC Pro Team began in January with the Tour Down Under.

Team roster

Riders who joined the team for the 2020 season

Riders who left the team during or after the 2019 season

Season victories

National, Continental and World champions

Footnotes

References

External links
 

2020 road cycling season by team
C
2020 in Polish sport